Closer is the third studio album by British hip hop musician Ty. It was released on Big Dada in 2006.

Critical reception
John Bush of AllMusic said: "With his third album, Ty earned the right to be called consistently brilliant." Bram Gieben of The Skinny called it "a purist hip-hop album, with 12 killer basslines, some really poppy hooks, and some intelligent, inspiring lyrics."

Track listing

References

External links
 

2006 albums
Ty (rapper) albums
Big Dada albums